American autocross is a form of autocross, an individual motorsport in which drivers compete to set the fastest time on a temporary course. Events are usually held on large paved areas, such as parking lots or airfields. Courses consist of turns, offsets, and slaloms marked by traffic cones; new courses are typically created for each event. 

The Sports Car Club of America (SCCA) is the largest autocross sanctioning body in the United States; the National Auto Sport Association (NASA) and various manufacturer-affiliated and independent clubs also hold events.

Event structure 

Before driving, competitors typically walk the course to learn its layout and develop a strategy for driving it. Drivers generally have three or more timed runs on the course, which usually last between thirty and ninety seconds. When not competing, most events require competitors to assist with event operations, usually by spotting and repositioning cones that other drivers have hit (colloquially known as “working the course”).

Participation

Autocross is an inexpensive form of motorsport. The potential for damage is lower than most other motorsport disciplines because of autocross' low average speeds, the lack of physical barriers alongside the course, and the fact that only one car navigates a given section of the course at a time.

Unlike most other motorsports, most participants compete in street-driven vehicles. A helmet is required, but many clubs have helmets available to be borrowed. Some clubs provide instruction for novice participants.

The SCCA has parallel classes (“Ladies”) specifically for female competitors; women may compete in either the regular (“Open”) or Ladies classes.

SCCA classes

While classes and rules vary between sanctioning bodies, the SCCA's classing structure is used by many independent clubs. The SCCA classing structure consists of six primary categories; in approximate order of ascending level of modification, the categories are Street, Street Touring, Street Prepared, Street Modified, Prepared, and Modified.

Street classes allow very little change from the car's original manufacture; most items that can be changed are normal wear items (filters, street-legal tires, shocks or struts and ignition wires). There are nine Street classes, ranging from Super Street for sports cars like the Porsche 911 GT3 and second-generation Acura NSX to H Street for cars like the Ford Fiesta ST and Honda Civic. 

Street Touring and Street Prepared classes allow some modifications to the suspension (wheels, springs, shocks), external engine parts (intakes and exhaust manifolds), and the interior (replacement of seats).
Street Modified cars retain production-based bodies and motors and are street-legal vehicles, but little else is stock. Prepared class is for production-based race cars with stripped interiors, major suspension changes, heavily-modified motors, and racing slick tires. Prepared cars are typically transported in trailers because they are not street-legal. The SCCA D- and E-Modified classes also have production cars, but allow any automotive-based engine, suspension redesign, and complete replacement of the body (typically with lightweight alloys or composites) as long as the original car is still recognizable. Although there are classes for purpose-built race cars imported from other series (including Formula Fords, D Sports Racers, Formula 500s and vehicles similar to American oval-track stock cars), most autocross cars are based on production cars.

The fastest autocross cars are purpose-built "specials" (A Modified in SCCA Solo) with small lightweight bodies, sticky tires, powerful engines, and short gears. While their top speeds are typically limited by gearing, their transient cornering capabilities exceed those of vehicles not designed for autocross.

Related sports
Autocross is also known as Solo (the SCCA's brand name) in the United States. Other regions of the world use different names. Parts of Canada and Eastern Europe (including Russia, Ukraine, and Moldova) call it autoslalom. In the United Kingdom, autocross is known as autosolo and is held on grass and dirt. In Southeast Asia, Malaysia and Thailand refer to the sport as autokhana.

Motorkhana (Australia and New Zealand) and autotesting (the UK and Ireland) are related sports. With speeds rarely exceeding 40 mph (60 km/h), motorkhana and autotesting are slower than American autocross, require hand-braking, and have sections that must be navigated in reverse. Autocross speeds can exceed 60 mph (100 km/h), and courses requiring drivers to reverse are generally prohibited. Hand-braking is also uncommon, and not usually necessary on a typical autocross course.

They are similar to the Japanese gymkhana, another type of handling competition. Gymkhanas are tighter than motorkhanas and autotests, with numerous 360-degree turns around cones and courses which loop back on themselves. Fast times require sliding, and resembles a combination of autocross and drifting. Gymkhana does not usually require backing up. In ProSolo, an SCCA-sanctioned variant of autocross, two cars run side by side on mirror-image courses after starting at a "Christmas tree" starting system similar to that used in drag racing.

See also
SCCA RallyCross

References

Further reading 
 Watts, Henry (1990). Secrets of Solo Racing: Expert Techniques for Autocrossing and Time Trials. Loki Publishing Company. .
 Turner, Richard (1977). Winning Autocross Solo II Competition: The Art and the Science. National Academy for Police Driving. .
 Pagel, Jim (1972). How to Win at Slalom and Autocross. .

External links 

Introduction to autocross by the SCCA

Auto racing by type
Sports Car Club of America

de:Automobil-Slalom
es:Autoslalom
lv:Autošoseja